Anthomyia is a genus of flies in the family Anthomyiidae. They look rather like small houseflies, but commonly have conspicuous black-and-white patterning. This appears to be a mild form of aposematic coloration, though they do not appear to be distasteful unless they have eaten something offensive to the predator and have loaded their guts with it.

Species

References

Anthomyiidae
Articles containing video clips
Schizophora genera
Taxa named by Johann Wilhelm Meigen